Kamil Agabekovich Agalarov (born 11 June 1988) is a Russian former professional footballer.

Club career
He made his professional debut in the Russian First Division for FC Dynamo Makhachkala on 8 August 2005 in a game against FC Avangard Kursk.

He made his Russian Premier League debut for FC Anzhi Makhachkala on 26 March 2010 in a game against PFC CSKA Moscow. He played for 5 seasons in the Russian Premier League.

Personal life
He is a younger brother of Ruslan Agalarov.

Career statistics

Club

References

1988 births
Footballers from Makhachkala
Living people
Russian footballers
Association football midfielders
Russian people of Dagestani descent
FC Chernomorets Novorossiysk players
FC Anzhi Makhachkala players
FC Rostov players
Russian Premier League players
FC Dynamo Makhachkala players
20th-century Russian people
21st-century Russian people